Lieutenant-Colonel Edward Gopsill,  (22 December 1921 – 25 July 2016) was a decorated British Army officer and founder of the 1st Malaysian Rangers.

Early life
Gopsill was born in Birkenhead in 1921.  He left school at fourteen and took a job with a brick-making company as his family was suffering financial hardship. He continued his education at nightschool where he studied accountancy.

Military career
Gopsill enlisted in The King’s (Liverpool) Regiment at the outbreak of the Second World War. His capabilities were noticed and he was selected for officer training. In 1942 he was commissioned into the 1st Gurkha Rifles and served with the 3rd Battalion in Burma. At the age of 23 he was awarded the Military Cross for his actions in Cochin-China.

In 1947 Gopsill transferred to the 7th Gurkha Rifles as his former regiment had been incorporated into the new Indian Army. He was posted to Malaya where a communist insurgency had started. In 1949 he was awarded the Distinguished Service Order for his exemplary bravery.

Gopsill was subsequently asked to raise a new regiment. Within 18 months he had recruited and trained one hundred local Iban tribesmen to form the 1st Malaysian Rangers. He then led them into action during Indonesia's confrontation with the newly formed Malaysia.

Gopsill's proficiency in jungle warfare led to him becoming chief instructor at the Brigade of Gurkhas Training Depot. In 1965 he was appointed an Officer of the Order of the British Empire for his services to the Malaysian Armed Forces.

Later life
Gopsill left the army in 1967 and spent his remaining working life as the bursar and clerk to the governors at the Royal Wolverhampton School.

Towards the end of his life he successfully campaigned to have a monument erected to the Gurkha regiments at the National Memorial Arboretum in Staffordshire.

References

1921 births
2016 deaths
Royal Gurkha Rifles officers
British Army personnel of the Indonesia–Malaysia confrontation
British Army personnel of the Malayan Emergency
British Indian Army officers
Companions of the Distinguished Service Order
Officers of the Order of the British Empire
People from Birkenhead
Recipients of the Military Cross
King's Regiment (Liverpool) soldiers
British Army personnel of World War II
Indian Army personnel of World War II
British people in British Burma
British expatriates in Vietnam
British people in British Malaya
Military personnel from Merseyside